Pujehun Central Mosque is the main mosque in Pujehun District in the South of Sierra Leone. The mosque is located in the town of Pujehun. The Chief Imam of the Pujehun Central Mosque is Sheik Alhaji Ahmed Jalloh. The mosque is also the seat of various Islamic cultural events.

See also
 Islam in Sierra Leone

References

External links
https://web.archive.org/web/20131101055546/http://africayoungvoices.com/2013/08/pujehun-muslim-jamat-pray-for-president-koroma-and-hail-moijueh-kaikai/
http://news.sl/drwebsite/publish/article_200523450.shtml

Mosques in Sierra Leone
Southern Province, Sierra Leone